Héctor Aarón Canjura Astorga (born 15 July 1976) is a retired football player from El Salvador.

Club career
Canjura started his professional career at ADET, but then joined Luis Ángel Firpo for a long spell. He ended his career at Nejapa in December 2009 to become an administrative manager at the club which was renamed Alacranes Del Norte.

International career
Canjura made his debut for El Salvador in a July 2000 FIFA World Cup qualification match against Honduras and has earned a total of 12 caps, scoring 1 goal. He has represented his country in 3 FIFA World Cup qualification matches and played at the 2001 UNCAF Nations Cup and at the 2002 CONCACAF Gold Cup.

His final international game was a January 2002 CONCACAF Gold Cup match against Mexico.

International goals
Scores and results list El Salvador's goal tally first.

Honours
Primera División de Fútbol de El Salvador: 2
 1999 Clausura, 2000 Clausura

References

External links
 
Profile - El Gráfico 

1976 births
Living people
Sportspeople from San Salvador
Association football midfielders
Salvadoran footballers
El Salvador international footballers
2001 UNCAF Nations Cup players
2002 CONCACAF Gold Cup players
C.D. Luis Ángel Firpo footballers
Nejapa footballers